Eaksatha Thanyakam (born July 1, 1979) is a Thai former professional footballer who played as a midfielder.

Honours

Club
Army United
 Thai Division 1 League (1): 2004-05

Paknampho NSRU
 Regional League Division 2 (1): 2013

External links
 Eaksatha Thanyakam at Goal

1979 births
Living people
Eaksatha Thanyakam
Association football midfielders
Eaksatha Thanyakam
Eaksatha Thanyakam
Eaksatha Thanyakam
Eaksatha Thanyakam
Eaksatha Thanyakam
Eaksatha Thanyakam
Eaksatha Thanyakam